Guy William "Tripp" Merritt III (March 5, 1968 – August 10, 2020) was an American football coach. He served as the head football coach at Davidson College from 2005  to 2012, compiling a record of 31–51. Merritt died on August 10, 2020, at Wilkes-Barre General Hospital, in Wilkes-Barre, Pennsylvania.

Head coaching record

College

Notes

References

External links
 Wilkes profile

1968 births
2020 deaths
Davidson Wildcats football coaches
Bucknell Bison football coaches
Lenoir–Rhyne Bears football coaches
Saint Mary's Gaels football coaches
Susquehanna River Hawks football coaches
Western Carolina Catamounts football coaches
Wilkes Colonels football coaches
High school football coaches in Florida
University of North Carolina at Charlotte alumni
People from Albemarle, North Carolina